The Czech Republic women's national under-20 basketball team is a national basketball team of the Czech Republic, administered by the Czech Basketball Federation. It represents the country in women's international under-20 basketball competitions.

FIBA U20 Women's European Championship participations

FIBA Under-21 World Championship for Women participations

See also
Czech Republic women's national basketball team
Czech Republic women's national under-19 basketball team

References

External links
Archived records of Czech Republic team participations

Basketball in the Czech Republic
Basketball
Women's national under-20 basketball teams